Ulavapadu is a village in Nellore district of the Indian state of Andhra Pradesh. Ulavapadu is famous for variety of mangoes such as banginapalli, rasalu  and also famous for a variety of Sapotas in Nellore district. The fruits produced here are exported to various states and countries. It is the mandal headquarters of Ulavapadu mandal in Kandukur revenue division.

Geography 

References 

Villages in Prakasam district